The North Fork Flathead River (Ktunaxa: kqaskanmituk ) is a  river flowing through British Columbia, Canada, south into the U.S. state of Montana. It is one of the three primary forks of the Flathead River, the main inflow of Flathead Lake and a tributary of the Columbia River via the Clark Fork River and the Pend Oreille River.  The river is sometimes considered the upper headwaters of the Flathead River, although the North Fork is its official name in the U.S. Other naming conventions for the river include Flathead River - North Fork, North Fork of Flathead River, and North Fork of the Flathead River.

Description

The river originates in a valley northeast of Lake Koocanusa in the Clark Range, and flows west. It then meets the Continental Divide and turns south, winding through a broad glacial valley. The river then crosses the Canada–US border into the state of Montana, where it begins to delineate the western boundary of Glacier National Park. Roughly following the "inner" and "outer" North Fork Roads and Montana Secondary Highway 486, the river winds southwest past Kintla Lake, Bowman Lake, Quartz Lake, Logging Lake, and Lake McDonald, then turns west and south into a narrower valley before joining the Middle Fork Flathead River near the southwestern entrance of the national park, several miles northeast of Columbia Falls.

Wild and Scenic River designation
Although the North Fork is designated as a National Wild and Scenic River (1975) in the United States, its greater length in BC (not including headwaters forks) is not. Water in the BC section remains relatively pure as there are no permanent residents or livestock in this drainage north of the border.

Dam proposal
In the 1940s the Glacier View Dam was proposed, which would have flooded much of the river's valley between Glacier View Mountain and the Canada–US border. The proposed dam  was cancelled by 1950.

See also

 List of rivers of Montana
 List of rivers of British Columbia
 Hungry Horse Reservoir

References

External links

Rivers of Montana
Rivers of British Columbia
International rivers of North America
Tributaries of the Columbia River
Landforms of Glacier National Park (U.S.)
Rivers of Flathead County, Montana
Wild and Scenic Rivers of the United States